Kolkata Knight Riders (KKR) is a franchise cricket team based in Kolkata, India, which plays in the Indian Premier League (IPL). They were one of the eight teams that competed in the 2008 Indian Premier League. They were captained by Sourav Ganguly. Kolkata Knight Riders finished sixth in the IPL and did not qualify for the Champions League T20.

Background 
The team made a good start to the season by winning their first two matches against Royal Challengers Bangalore and Deccan Chargers. Opening batsman Brendon McCullum scored 158 runs in the first match. However, the team began to experience failures and lost the next four matches. The team managed to stage a comeback of sorts by winning the next three matches, helped by strong performances by Sourav Ganguly and Shoaib Akhtar. But their performance dipped again and they lost the next three matches. These included their match against Mumbai Indians, in which they were bowled out for 67 runs, the lowest score by a team in the IPL 2008 season. When their match against Delhi Daredevils was washed out due to rain, they lost any chance of making it to the semifinals. The Knight Riders ended their season on a winning note by defeating Kings XI Punjab on their home ground.

Indian Premier League

Season standings
Kolkata Knight Riders finished sixth in the league stage of IPL 2008.

Match log

References

Kolkata Knight Riders seasons
2008 Indian Premier League